The Mokin Museum is a museum in Seoul, South Korea.

See also
List of museums in South Korea

Museums in Seoul